Władysławowo  (Kashubian/Pomeranian: Wiôlgô Wies) is a city on the south coast of the Baltic Sea in Kashubia in the Pomerelia region, northern Poland, with 15,015 (2009) inhabitants.

History
In 1634 engineer Fryderyk Getkant designed a fort called Władysławowo located on the Hel Peninsula, several km east of today's town of Władysławowo. It was officially recorded as a fort a year later.

It was successfully built as a new town as a Polish fishing port in 1930s during the Polish Second Republic, with fishing a key part of the Polish economy at the time. Construction began in March 1936, and the new town was officially inaugurated on the 3 May 1938.

It was named after King Władysław IV Vasa, who initiated the construction of the Polish Navy.

After growing and incorporating several of the surrounding villages and settlements into its boundaries since then the town officially received town rights on 30 June 1963. It continued to expand through with several more villages becoming its neighbourhoods.

Currently Władysławowo is a sea port and a popular seaside holiday destination.

Administration
The gmina (urban-rural municipality) of Władysławowo consists of the town Władysławowo (with a district Cetniewo) and seven villages: Chałupy (to the east, on the Hel peninsula), Rozewie, Jastrzębia Góra, Ostrowo, Karwia and Tupadły. Several of these places serve as popular seaside resorts.

The city is currently situated in the Puck County in the Pomeranian Voivodeship, since the 1999 reorganisation. It was previously in Gdańsk Voivodeship, between 1975 and 1998.

Geography
Poland's northern extremity is situated in Jastrzębia Góra, marked by the Gwiazda Północy ("Northern Star") monument, which stands on a cliff overlooking the beach that is the actual most northerly point. The nearby headland of Cape Rozewie was formerly believed to be the country's most northerly point, prior to measurements carried out in December 2000.

Transport
Władysławowo and Władysławowo Port are PKP railway stations in the town.

Population 

1960:  3,900 inhabitants
1970:  7,900 inhabitants
1975:  9,200 inhabitants
1980: 10,600 inhabitants
2009: 15,000 inhabitants

Notable people 
 Hermann Keidanski (1865–1938) a German-Jewish chess master
 Nocne Szczury (literally: Night Rats) a Polish punk rock band formed in 1980

Gallery

References

External links
 Town website

 Site about the city of Władysławowo
 Hotel Władysławowo

Cities and towns in Pomeranian Voivodeship
Puck County